Neurothemis is a genus of dragonflies in the family Libellulidae. 
They are found in India, Asia, Australia and the Pacific region. 
Most Neurothemis species are red in color.

Species
The genus Neurothemis includes the following species:

References

External links

IDF: Morphological studies and taxonomic considerations on the ‘reddish-brown-winged’ group of Neurothemis

Libellulidae
Anisoptera genera
Odonata of Australia
Odonata of Asia
Insects of New Guinea
Insects of Indonesia
Insects of Southeast Asia
Insects of India
Taxa named by Friedrich Moritz Brauer